Kittipon Kittikul (born 9 September 1975) is a Thai badminton player. He competed in the men's singles tournament at the 1996 Summer Olympics.

References

External links
 

1975 births
Living people
Kittipon Kittikul
Kittipon Kittikul
Badminton players at the 1996 Summer Olympics
Place of birth missing (living people)